Stegastes fasciolatus, commonly called the Pacific gregory, is a species of damselfish in the family Pomacentridae. It is native to the tropical western Indo-Pacific. It feeds on filamentous algae.

Distribution and habitat
Stegastes fasciolatus is native to the western Indo-Pacific region. Its range extends from East Africa to Australia and the Kermadec Islands including Hawaii, Easter Island and the Ryukyu Islands. where it is found on shallow seaward reefs particularly in areas with mild to moderate water movement. At Lord Howe Island and Easter Island it occurs from shallow surge pools down to depths of at least .

Behavior 
Stegastes fasciolatus is a territorial fish and may defend a small area for nesting or food. When algae is plentiful they are less aggressively.

References

External links
 

fasciolatus
Fish described in 1889